Daria Pogorzelec (born 20 July 1990) is a Polish judoka who competed at the 2012 and 2016 Olympics.

At the 2012 Summer Olympics, she beat Anamari Velenšek in the first round of the women's half-heavyweight competition, then Heide Wollert before losing to Mayra Aguiar. Pogorzelec was entered into the bronze medal repechage, where she lost to Abigél Joó.

At the 2016 Summer Olympics, she beat Hortence Atangana before losing to Luise Malzahn,

In 2013, she won bronze at the World Military Games.

References

External links

 
 
 

1990 births
Living people
Polish female judoka
Olympic judoka of Poland
Judoka at the 2012 Summer Olympics
Judoka at the 2016 Summer Olympics
Sportspeople from Gdańsk
European Games competitors for Poland
Judoka at the 2015 European Games
Judoka at the 2019 European Games
21st-century Polish women